BKN, Inc. or Bohbot Entertainment is an American advertising and marketing company specializing in the children's market.

BKN may also refer to:

 BKN (TV station), Australian regional television station
 BKN International, a German kids TV production and distribution company
 Blackwell–Tonkawa Municipal Airport, the FAA LID code BKN
 Bohbot Kids Network, a children's programming block operated by Bohbot Entertainment
 ISO 639:bkn, the ISO 639 code for the Bukitan language
 National Security Division (Bahagian Keselamatan Negara), a senior grouping within the Malaysian government
 Brooklyn Nets, a basketball team in the National Basketball Association